Periodontal membrane may refer to:
 The periodontal ligament (PDL), largely referred to as the periodontal membrane outside of the United States
 An artificial periodontal membrane, used to block the spread of growing epithelium after periodontal surgery.

 Also is used as a term by dentists to the part of the tooth which holds the cement to the jaw bone.